Vineyard Norden Summercamp is a Christian family camp held for one week every summer for many years by Vineyard Norden, an association of Nordic and Scandinavian churches. It is a branch of the international Christian Association of Vineyard Churches, also known as the Vineyard Movement or Vineyard Christian Fellowship.

Location
In the first years the camp was arranged for circulation between the Vineyard churches in Norway, Sweden and Denmark. Denmark later had to withdraw as a location country, because there are only a few Vineyard Churches in that country. After some years arranging the camp, it circulated between the Norwegian and the Swedish churches. It was held  in Sweden in 2003-04 and 2006–07; Norway in 2002, 2005 and 2008.

2002 to 2008

Sweden
 2003 at Hjälmaregåden conference center, by Sweden's 4th largest lake.
 2004, 2006, 2007 at Liljeholmens college, by the village of Rimforsa in Kinda Municipality in Östergötland County, not far from the town of Vimmerby where children's writer Astrid Lindgren was born.

Norway
 2002 at the city Kristiansand, county capital of Vest-Agder.
 2005 at Stavern Folkehøyskole Fredtun, Stavern.
 2008 at Risøy folk high school on the Risøy island at Gjeving in Tvedestrand, Aust-Agder fylke, Norway.

2009 onwards
Vineyard Nordic Summercamp has, since 2009, been held in Sweden at Nyhem, which is owned and run by the Swedish pentecostal Christian movement, Pingströrelsen. One of the main reasons cited to stay in Nyhem was the large new big hall, Nyhemshallen (the Nyhem Hall) built in 2008.

Participants
Vineyard Norden Summercamp has many participants from all over the Nordic countries, as well as guests from other parts of the world.

Summercamp normally gathers between 800 and 1000 diverse participants, ranging from campers (people with tents or caravans that make their own food) to people who buy full accommodation and food. There are various types of accommodations.

Vineyard Nordic Summercamp is a Nordic camp (with English and Scandinavian translations), but every year there are guests from at least one eastern European Vineyard church (normally one that is supported by the Vineyard Nordic churches or cooperate with the Vineyard Nordic churches). There are also guests from other places in Europe, and even from the US, Canada, South Africa and other far away places.

Well-known characteristics
Well-known characteristics for a Vineyard Nordic Summercamp are an equal mix of social interaction (a very important element in the Christian Vineyard Movement), meetings, seminars, and diverse free time activities for all ages. There are also really popular "night cafés" where the participants meet informally over a cup of coffee or something "to bite" with entertainment from the scene (everything from ballads and poems to blues and rock). One night during the week is "Open Scene" where everyone can just "pop up".

External links
 Vineyard Norden Summercamp, the official website.
 Vineyard Norden, the website of the organiser of Vineyard Norden Summercamp. Also the website of Vineyard Sweden.
 Vineyard Norway
 Vineyard Denmark
 Hjälmaregåden conference center, where the Summercamp was held in 2003.
 Stavern Folkehøyskole Fredtun, where the Summercamp was held in 2005.
 Nyhemshallen (Nyhem Hall), where the Summercamp has been held since 2009.
 Pingströrelsen, the owners of Nyhem, where the Summercamp has been held since 2009.

Summer camps